Dugdale Glacier is a glacier about  long, draining northeast from the Admiralty Mountains into Robertson Bay on the north coast of Victoria Land, Antarctica. The geographical feature flows along the west side of Geikie Ridge before coalescing with Murray Glacier just west of Duke of York Island. It was charted by the British Antarctic Expedition, 1898–1900, under Carsten Borchgrevink, who named it for Frank Dugdale of Snitterfield, Stratford-on-Avon. The glacier lies situated on the Pennell Coast, a portion of Antarctica lying between Cape Williams and Cape Adare.

References 

Glaciers of Pennell Coast